Windpark Spremberg is a 9-turbine, 22.5MW wind farm located about 5km (3 miles) away from the city centre of Spremberg, to the east. In requirement taken the surface, in parts the city forest of Spremberg, lies on a hill and offers from there ideal conditions for the operation of these plants. Owner is the investment company Ampere Equity Fund. It acquired the complete system in April 2009 of the WSB Neue Energien GmbH Saxonia, which had come out with the advertisements for the establishment wind park of the Spremberg among 21 applicants as a winner. The park consists the installed electrical equipment of nine Fuhrlander FL-2500 wind turbines with a hub height of 141 m and a rotor diameter of 100 M. amounts to 9 x 2.5 MW [1], thus altogether 22.5 MW. Thus it is to be possible to supply about 60,000 persons with river. Per year on a generation of current by approximately 55 GWh one counts. After completion the wind park Spremberg is the highest latticed mast wind park of the world. At present highest individual latticed mast windwheel of the world is the Fuhrländer Wind Turbine Laasow. The wind park Spremberg forms a descriptive contrast to the brown coal power station black one pump in range of vision. After present planning the wind park is to be extended starting from 2012 by further eight plants.

Construction 

In the year 2003 the area of the current wind park Spremberg was proven as area for wind-power plants. Over the final overall height there were Spremberg to last different opinions between the operator company and the city. The city Spremberg demanded that the wind energy plants do not exceed an overall height of 180 m. The WSB new energies GmbH, which had come out as a winner of the advertisement among 21 competitors, recorded however to the original plans to establish wind energy plants of up to 195 m overall height. Only in December 2006 the Spremberger decided town council to give the demanded overall height of 195 m instead of. In January 2008 the foundations for the planned nine wind energy plants were manufactured. With the establishment of the latticed mast construction, which has a weight of 350 tons, in September 2008 one began. The first latticed mast, still without car and wing, stood on 12 September 2008. On 6 October 2008 this became by the parts, like rotors, already pre-mounted at the ground, machine building (with generator, transmission, transformer and the complete control) as well as rotor blades, which together a weight of approximately 60 tons (rotor) and/or 96 tons (car) have, completes. On 17 April 2009 becomes admits, which sold the WSB Neue Energien GmbH the wind park Spremberg to 100% to the Dutch investment company Ampere Equity Fund. After all acceptance tests successfully ran, the wind park Spremberg became to 19. May 2009 with a symbolic mains connection taken in enterprise. The total investment sum amounts to approx. 35 million euros.

Special Features 

The wing with an overall length, necessary for the wind-power plants, of in each case 50 m had to be transported with the delivery by the city center over the market place of Spremberg. This way made itself necessary, since all other approach roads did not exhibit the necessary turning radius. To the establishment of the wind-power plants the largest mobile truck crane in the world was used. Its structure takes about two weeks and the necessary parts is distributed thereby on 30 heavy load transporters.

External links

Buildings and structures in Spree-Neiße
Wind farms in Germany
Economy of Brandenburg
Wind Park